Commercial Type is a digital type foundry established in 2007 by type designers Paul Barnes and Christian Schwartz. Its work includes typefaces for The Guardian, such as the Guardian Egyptian series, and other retail and commissioned typefaces. It created the open-source Roboto Serif typeface for Google and several of its typefaces are bundled with macOS.

References

External links

Commercial type foundries
Design companies established in 2007
Graphic design studios
Companies based in Manhattan
2007 establishments in New York City